Communist Movement of Catalonia (MCC) was the federated political party of the Communist Movement (MC) in Catalonia. The MCC was founded in 1974.

Ideology
Originally the MCC was a Maoist party, inspired by the Chinese Cultural Revolution, but over the years, specially after 1981-82, the organization gradually abandoned its previous ideologies (Orthodox Marxism, Leninism, Maoism) in favour of more heterodox forms of Marxism. The party was also supportive of the Feminist, Catalanist, LGBT and Insurbordinate social movements. The MCC was also highly supportive of the Catalan independence movement.

History
The MCC appeared in 1974, joining the Assembly of Catalonia that same year. The MCC participated in the coalition Unity for Socialism in the first autonomic Catalan elections (1980). In 1991, after years of close collaboration, the MCC and the LCR merged and formed a new party, Izquierda Alternativa (IA). Revolta was the Catalan branch of IA. The LCR members left Revolta in 1993.

References

 Laíz, Consuelo: La lucha final. Los partidos de la izquierda radical durante la transición española. Madrid: Libros de la Catarata, 1995.

Defunct communist parties in Catalonia
Political parties established in 1974
1974 establishments in Catalonia
Political parties disestablished in 1991
1991 disestablishments in Spain